Brendon Cameron (born 12 February 1973) is a former New Zealand track cyclist. He won a bronze medal at the 1994 Commonwealth Games in the men's team pursuit, and followed it up four years later with another bronze medal in the same event at the 1998 Commonwealth Games. He then moved into coaching, most famously coaching partner Sarah Ulmer to a world record and gold medal in the individual pursuit event at the 2004 Athens Olympics. He was a finalist for coach of the year at the 2004 Halberg Awards.

References

External links
 

New Zealand male cyclists
Olympic cyclists of New Zealand
Commonwealth Games bronze medallists for New Zealand
Cyclists at the 1994 Commonwealth Games
Cyclists at the 1998 Commonwealth Games
Cyclists at the 1996 Summer Olympics
Cyclists at the 2000 Summer Olympics
New Zealand track cyclists
1973 births
Living people
Sportspeople from Waikato
Commonwealth Games medallists in cycling
20th-century New Zealand people
21st-century New Zealand people
Medallists at the 1994 Commonwealth Games
Medallists at the 1998 Commonwealth Games